Tahir Khan may refer to:
 Tahir Khan (Pakistani cricketer) (born 1981)
 Tahir Khan (Afghan cricketer) (born 1997)